This is a list of notable films whose main subject is treasure hunting.

0 - 9 
 9 Souls (Nain Souruzu, 2003)

A
 The A.R.K. Report – Secret for the Century (2013)
 The Adventurer: The Curse of the Midas Box (2013)
 The Adventurers (1951)
 The Adventurers  (Авантюристы, 2014) 
 The Adventurers  (2017)
 The Adventures of Tintin (2011)
 Aladdin and the King of Thieves (1995)
 All the Brothers Were Valiant (1923)
 All the Brothers Were Valiant (1953)
 Allan Quatermain
 Allan Quatermain and the Lost City of Gold (1986)
 Allan Quatermain and the Temple of Skulls (2008)
 Anacondas: The Hunt for the Blood Orchid (2004)
 Animal Treasure Island (1971)
 The Ark of the Sun God (Sopravvissuti della città morta; 1984)

B
 Bait (1954)
 Barroz (2022)
 Between God, the Devil and a Winchester (Anche nel west c'era una volta Dio, 1968)
 Beat the Devil (1953)
 Below the Sea (1933)
 Black Mor's Island  (L'île de Black Mór, 2004)
 Black Sea (2014)
 Blue (2009)
 Blueberry (Blueberry : L'expérience secrète, 2004)
 Boy (2010)
 Boy on a Dolphin (1957) 
 Burning Sands (Brennender Sand, 1960)

C 
 Captain Calamity (1936)
 Carbon (2018)
 Carib Gold (1956)
 Ces dames préfèrent le mambo (1957) 
 Charade (1963)
 City Beneath the Sea (1953)
 City Slickers II: The Legend of Curly's Gold (1994)
 Coast of Skeletons (1965)
 Congo (1995)
 The Count of Monte Cristo (2002)
 Crosswinds (1951)
 Cutthroat Island (1995)

D
 Da 5 Bloods (2020)
 The Da Vinci Code (2006)
 The Da Vinci Treasure (2006)
 The Dagger of Kamui (Kamui no Ken, 1984)
 The Deep (1977)
 Do or Die (1921)
 Doraemon: Nobita's Treasure Island (Doraemon Nobita no Takarajima, 2018)

E
 Easy Come, Easy Go (1967)
 The Emerald of Artatama  (La muchacha del Nilo, 1969)
 Enemy Gold (1993)
 The Evil Below (1989)

F
 Fear Is the Key (1972)
 Federal Agents vs. Underworld, Inc (1949) 
 Felix and the Treasure of Morgäa (Félix et le trésor de Morgäa, 2021)
 The Fighting Skipper (1923)
 Firewalker (1986)
 Flight to Fury (1964)
 Franco, Ciccio e il pirata Barbanera (1969)
 Fool's Gold (2008)
 Forbidden Island (1959)

G 
 Gandu Bherunda
 Ghost Diver
 The Glass Sphinx
 Go West! A Lucky Luke Adventure
 Gold (2016)
 Gold Diggers: The Secret of Bear Mountain
 The Good, the Bad and the Ugly
 The Goonies
 The Grave (1996)
 Grave Robbers
 Green Hell
 Guru Sishyan (1988)

H
 Haunted Island
 Hell's Island
 The Hessen Affair
 The Hobbit: An Unexpected Journey
 The Hobbit: The Desolation of Smaug
 Hollywood.Con
 Hunters of the Golden Cobra
 Hurricane Smith (1952)

I
 In the Shadow of the Cobra (2004)
 Impasse (1969)
 Indiana Jones
 Raiders of the Lost Ark (1981)
 The Temple of Doom (1984)
 The Last Crusade  (1989)
 Kingdom of the Crystal Skull (2008)
 Indiana Jones and the Dial of Destiny (2023)
 Insaf Ki Pukar (1987)
 Into the Blue (2005)
 Into the Blue 2: The Reef (2009)
 Isle of Forgotten Sins (1943)

 Isle of Sunken Gold (1927)
 It's a Mad, Mad, Mad, Mad World (1963)

J
 The Jack of Diamonds
 Jawker Dhan
 Jay Vejay
 The Jewel of the Nile (1985)
 Jungle Cruise
 Jungle Raiders (1985)

K
 Khazana (1987)
 King of California (2007)
 King Solomon's Mines (1937)
 King Solomon's Mines (1950)
 King Solomon's Mines (1985)
 King Solomon's Mines (2004)
 King Solomon's Treasure (1979)
 Kodama Simham (1990)
 Kolkatay Kohinoor (2019)  
 Krampus Unleashed (2016) 
 Kumiko, the Treasure Hunter (2014)
 Kung Fu Yoga (功夫瑜伽, 2017)

L
 Labou (2008)
 Lara Croft
 Lara Croft: Tomb Raider (2001)
 Lara Croft: Tomb Raider – The Cradle of Life (2003)
 The Last Adventure (Les Aventuriers; 1967)
 The Legend Hunters (鬼吹灯之天星术, 2022)
 The Librarian 
 The Librarian: Quest for the Spear (2004)
 The Librarian: Return to King Solomon's Mines (2006)
 The Librarian: Curse of the Judas Chalice (2008)

 Long John Silver (1954)
 Long Live Your Death (Viva la muerte... tua!, 1971)
 The Lost City (2022)
 Lost Treasure (2003)
 The Lost Treasure of the Knights Templar (Tempelriddernes skat, 2006)
 Lupin III: The First (Rupan Sansei Za Fāsuto, 2019)
 Lust for Gold (1949)

M

 Mackenna's Gold
 The Maltese Falcon (1941)
 Manfish
 Manina, the Girl in the Bikini
 Mara Maru
 The Mask of Sheba
 Midnight Crossing
 Midnight Madness (1980)
 Million Dollar Mystery
 The Mine with the Iron Door (1924)
 The Mine with the Iron Door (1936)
 The Mummy (1999)
 Muppet Treasure Island (1996)
 Mystery Mansion (1983)

N
 Naksha
 National Treasure (franchise) 
 National Treasure 
 National Treasure: Book of Secrets (2007)
 No Gold for a Dead Diver
 Northeast of Seoul

O
 O Brother, Where Art Thou? (2000) 
 Oasis of the Zombies (L'Abîme des Morts-Vivants; La tumba de los muertos vivientes / The Abyss of the Living Dead, 1982)  
 On the Reeperbahn at Half Past Midnight (Auf der Reeperbahn nachts um halb eins, 1954)
 One Piece (2000)
 One Piece: Giant Mecha Soldier of Karakuri Castle (2006)
 One Piece: Stampede (2019)
 Outlaw Trail: The Treasure of Butch Cassidy (2006)

P
 Paradise for Sailors
 The Pearls of the Crown
 The Pink Jungle
 Pirate Treasure
 Pirates of the Caribbean: The Curse of the Black Pearl
 Pirates of the Caribbean: Dead Man's Chest
 Pirates of the Caribbean: Dead Men Tell No Tales
 Pirates of the Caribbean: On Stranger Tides
 Pirates of Treasure Island
 The Pirates: The Last Royal Treasure
 Plunder (serial)
 Plunder of the Sun
 The Prisoner of Château d'If
 Pudhaiyal

Q
 Quick, Let's Get Married

R
 Race for the Yankee Zephyr
 Raiders of the Lost Ark
 Rat Race
 The Real Macaw
 Return to Treasure Island
 Revelation (2001)
 Riders of the Whistling Skull
 Rio das Mortes
 Road to Utopia
 Romancing the Stone (1984)
 Rommel's Treasure
 Royal Treasure
 The Ruffian

S
 Sahara (2005)
 Sahasam (2013)
 Saint Petersburg
 Sam Whiskey
 Satan's Sister
 Scalawag
 Scavenger Hunt
 The Sea God
 Secret of the Andes
 Secret of the Sphinx
 The Secret of Treasure Island (1938)
 September Storm
 The Seventh Coin
 The Shadow of Chikara
 The Shark Hunter
 Shark!
 Sharks' Treasure
 Sinbad of the Seven Seas
 Sinbad the Sailor (1947)
 Slither  (1973)
 Smuggler's Island
 Snowbound (1948)
 South of Algiers
 Spellcaster
 A Splendid Hazard
 St Trinian's 2: The Legend of Fritton's Gold
 The Stranger and the Gunfighter
 Street of Darkness
 The Syndicate (1968)

T
 Takkari Donga
 Tex and the Lord of the Deep
 That Man from Rio
 Three Kings (1999)
 The Tiger's Trail
 Tom and Jerry: Shiver Me Whiskers
 Tom and Jerry: The Fast and the Furry
 Towers of Silence
 Transformers: Revenge of the Fallen
 Transformers: The Last Knight
 Treasure Buddies
 Treasure Island (1918)
 Treasure Island (1920)
 Treasure Island (1934)
 Treasure Island (1938)
 Treasure Island (1950)
 Treasure Island (1972) 
 Treasure Island (1973)
 Treasure Island (1982)
 Treasure Island (1986)
 Treasure Island (1988)
 Treasure Island (1990)
 Treasure Island (1995)
 Treasure Island (1999)
 The Treasure of Bird Island
 The Treasure of Jamaica Reef
 The Treasure of Lost Canyon
 Treasure of Matecumbe
 The Treasure of Monte Cristo
 Treasure of the Four Crowns

 The Treasure of the Sierra Madre  
 Treasure Planet (2002)
 The Treasure Planet (Планетата на съкровищата, Planetata na sakrovishtata, 1982)
 Treasure Raiders
 The Treasure Seekers (1979)
 Trespass  (1992)
 The Truth About Spring

U
 Unbelievable Adventures of Italians in Russia
 Uncharted
 Underwater!

W
 Wake of the Red Witch
 The Walking Hills
 Wanda Nevada
 The Way to the Gold
 Weekend at Bernie's II
 Wet Gold
 White Fire
 White Gold (2003)
 Wings Over Africa
 Without a Paddle
 Wizards of Waverly Place: The Movie

Y 
 The Yellow Mountain

Z 
 Zalzala (1988)

References 

 *